The Noatak River is a river in the northwestern part of the U.S. state of Alaska.

Description
The Noatak River's headwaters are on the north flank of Mount Igikpak in the Schwatka Mountains of the Brooks Range in the Gates of the Arctic National Park.

The river's entire course is north of the Arctic Circle. Leaving Gates of the Arctic National Park the river enters the Noatak National Preserve which exactly delineates the river's watershed.  The entire watershed of the Noatak River, not just the river itself, lies within these two protected areas, from the headwaters to where it leaves the Noatak National Preserve, which is a point approximately 20 river miles upstream of Noatak village and 90 river miles upstream of the river's delta in Kotzebue Sound. Even on this last part of the river most of the watershed lies within either Noatak National Preserve or Cape Krusenstern National Monument, with only the immediate river valley outside of these protected areas. The Noatak basin is the largest undisturbed watershed in the United States. The Noatak National Preserve alone encompasses .

There are small inholdings of private land within the National Preserve, some of these have private cabins.
The only permanent settlement along the Noatak River is the village of Noatak. The village has a  lighted public gravel airstrip, several small stores, post office, and a school.
 
The Noatak is fed by a relatively large watershed: as for some other large braided Arctic rivercourses, rare severe rain events can result in temporary rapid inundation, to a depth of several feet, of normally dry river bars. There are a few small remnant glaciers in the Schwatka Mountains, their contribution to the water budget of the Noatak is negligible.

Name origin
Named Inland River by surgeon John Simpson of the Royal Navy on a map he prepared in 1853, his wording appears to be a general translation of the Inuit name Nunulak, according to the United States Geological Survey. The name Nunatak could also mean "new land" or "belong to the land."

"Wild and Scenic" designation

See also
List of rivers of Alaska
List of National Wild and Scenic Rivers

References

External links
 National Park Service photos

Rivers of North Slope Borough, Alaska
Rivers of Northwest Arctic Borough, Alaska
Rivers of Alaska
Wild and Scenic Rivers of the United States
Gates of the Arctic National Park and Preserve
Brooks Range
Drainage basins of the Chukchi Sea